François Laroque (born 26 April 1948) is a French academic and translator specialising in the works of William Shakespeare. He is professor emeritus of the University of Sorbonne Nouvelle Paris 3 since 2014.

Career 
François Laroque is a former student of the École Normale Supérieure, he graduated with a Docteur d'État in 1985. He taught English literature at the Paul Valéry University, Montpellier III from 1973 to 1990, then at the New Sorbonne University in Paris from 1990 to 2014.

He is a Shakespeare specialist and a member of the centre for Elizabethan research at Paul Valéry University. He wrote  for the collection ‘Découvertes Gallimard’, translated into ten languages, including English, and often reprinted, as well as a collaborator on an anthology of English literature.

Selected publications 
 The Journal of François Laroque, Ye Galleon Press, 1981
 Shakespeare’s Festive World: Elizabethan Seasonal Entertainment and the Professional Stage, Cambridge University Press, 1991, paperback in 1993
 Shakespeare : Comme il vous plaira, collection « Découvertes Gallimard » (nº 126), série Littératures. Éditions Gallimard, 1991 (eleven international editions: American, British, German, Hungarian, Japanese, Korean, Portuguese, Russian, Swedish, Simplified and Traditional Chinese)
 US edition – The Age of Shakespeare, "Abrams Discoveries" series. Harry N. Abrams, 1993
 UK edition – Shakespeare: Court, Crowd and Playhouse, ‘New Horizons’ series. Thames & Hudson, 1993
 Co-editor with Pierre Iselin and Sophie Alatorre, "And that’s true too": New Essays on King Lear, Cambridge Scholars Publishing, 2009
 Dictionnaire amoureux de Shakespeare, Plon, 2016
Translations
 Roméo et Juliette, Livre de Poche, 2005
 Le marchand de Venise, Le livre de Poche, 2008
 La Tempête, Livre de Poche, 2011

References 

1948 births
English–French translators
Shakespearean scholars
École Normale Supérieure alumni
Living people